Scrambl3 is a secure communication mobile app developed by USMobile. Scrambl3 implements NSA's Fishbowl (secure phone) techniques and runs both on Android and iOS platforms.

References

Mobile applications